The  Mir Chakar Khan Rind University (MCKRU) is a public university located in Sibi, Balocistan, Pakistan.

History
It was established in 2019. The university was named after a Baloch folk hero Mir Chakar Khan Rind.

References

External links
 MCKRU official website

Educational institutions established in 2019
2019 establishments in Pakistan
Sibi District
Public universities and colleges in Balochistan, Pakistan